Enol Rodríguez Heres (born 28 July 2001) is a Spanish footballer who plays as a forward for Real Oviedo Vetusta.

Club career
Born in Candás, Asturias, Rodríguez began his career with hometown side Candás CF, making his first team debut on 9 March 2019 by starting in a 2–2 Regional Preferente home draw against CD Vallobín. In July of that year, he moved to Marino de Luanco and returned to youth football.

In July 2021, after already featuring for Marino's first team in Segunda División B, Rodríguez joined UD Logroñés and was initially assigned to the reserves in Segunda División RFEF. On 22 June 2022, he signed for another reserve team, Real Oviedo Vetusta also in the fourth tier.

Rodríguez made his first team debut with the Carbayones on 17 February 2023, coming on as a half-time substitute for Koba Koindredi in a 2–1 Segunda División away loss against FC Cartagena.

References

External links

2001 births
Living people
People from Gijón (Asturian comarca)
Spanish footballers
Footballers from Asturias
Association football forwards
Segunda División players
Segunda División B players
Segunda Federación players
Divisiones Regionales de Fútbol players
Marino de Luanco footballers
UD Logroñés B players
Real Oviedo Vetusta players
Real Oviedo players